Thebes Province was one of the provinces of the Boeotia Prefecture, Greece. Its territory corresponded with that of the current municipalities Tanagra and Thebes and the municipal units Thespies and Akraifnia. It was abolished in 2006.

References

Provinces of Greece
Boeotia